Wachi is a sub tehsil in Shopian district of Jammu Kashmir, India. It is situated on the banks of river Rambi Ara.

See also
 Zainapora
 Aglar
 Litter, Pulwama
 Pulwama
 Chitragam
 Bijbehara
 Anantnag
 Zainapora Sub District

References

Villages in Shopian district